There are a total of 50 Chief Justices of India who have served since the establishment of the Supreme Court of India in 1950, which superseded the Federal Court of India. The current and 50th Chief Justice is Justice Dhananjaya Y. Chandrachud, who entered office on 9 November 2022.

Precursor

Federal Court of India (1937–50)
The Federal Court of India came into being on 1 October 1937. The seat of the court was the Chamber of Princes in the Parliament building in Delhi. It began with a chief justice and two puisne judges. The first chief justice was Sir Maurice Gwyer and the other two judges were Sir Shah Muhammad Sulaiman and Mukund Ramrao Jayakar. It functioned until the establishment of the Supreme Court of India on 28 January 1950.

List of Chief Justices of India 

 ‡ – Date of Resignation

Trivia

Tenure 

 Yeshwant Vishnu Chandrachud, the 16th chief justice, is the longest-serving chief justice, serving over seven years ( – ).
 Kamal Narain Singh, the 22nd chief justice, is the shortest-serving, for 17 days ( – ).

Parent High Court 

The Bombay High Court has given ten chief justices of India, more than any other high court. Additionally, two chief justices, the 13th chief justice Sarv Mittra Sikri and the 49th chief justice Uday Umesh Lalit were elevated directly from the Bar Council of India.

Longevity 

 Amal Kumar Sarkar was the longest-lived chief justice of India, he died at the age of 100. 
 Five chief justices, Ajit Nath Ray, Prafullachandra Natwarlal Bhagwati, Kamal Narain Singh, Manepalli Narayanarao Venkatachaliah, and Aziz Mushabber Ahmadi are nonagenarians.
 Harilal Jekisundas Kania is the shortest-lived chief justice, he died in office at the age of 61.

Family relations 

 Harilal Jekisundas Kania, the 1st chief justice, was the uncle of Madhukar Hiralal Kania, the 23rd chief justice.
 Ranganath Misra, the 21st chief justice, was the uncle of Dipak Misra, the 45th chief justice.
 Yeshwant Vishnu Chandrachud, the 16th  chief justice, was the father of Dhananjaya Yeshwant Chandrachud, the 50th chief justice.

Representation 

 Mohammad Hidayatullah, the 11th chief justice, was the first CJI from the Muslim community.
 Sam Piroj Bharucha, the 30th Chief Justice, was the first CJI from the Parsi community.
 Konakuppakatil Gopinathan Balakrishnan, the 37th chief justice, was the first CJI from the Dalit community.
 Rajendra Mal Lodha, the 41st chief justice, was the first from the Jain community.
 Jagdish Singh Khehar, the 44th chief justice, was the first CJI from the Sikh community.

Retirement 
Normally, a chief justice retires on his birthday.

See also
 List of current Indian chief justices
 List of sitting judges of the Supreme Court of India
 List of female judges of the Supreme Court of India
 List of former judges of the Supreme Court of India

References

chief justices of India
Chief justices of India
Judiciary of India